Qaleh-ye Malekabad or Qaleh-i-Malakabad may refer to:
 Qaleh-ye Malekabad, Fars
 Qaleh-ye Malekabad, Razavi Khorasan